Shirley A. Smith (born November 29, 1950) is an American politician who served as a member of the Ohio Senate from 2007 to 2014. Previously, she was a member of the Ohio House of Representatives. She is a Democrat.

Early life and education 
Smith is a native of Cleveland. She earned an associate degree from Cuyahoga Community College and a Bachelor of Arts degree from Cleveland State University.

Career
Smith has worked in sales and marketing, and as a radio talk-show host for a major radio station in Cleveland, and has also served as an independent consultant for Coca-Cola Bottling Company.

When incumbent C. J. Prentiss decided to run for the Ohio Senate, Smith and four other Democrats sought to replace her in the 1998 primary election. Smith won the District 8 nomination with 35.29% of the vote. She won the general election against Republican Dominic Rini with 86.15% of the vote. Smith won reelection in District 8 in 2000 against Republican Ronnie Jones with 87.2% of the vote.

In 2002, Smith again faced a primary challenge from four other Democrats, due to redistricting. However she won the District 10 nomination with 43.66% of the vote. She went unopposed in the general election and was unopposed for the 2004 general election. For the 126th General Assembly, Smith served as secretary of the Ohio Legislative Black Caucus (OLBC).

Ohio Senate
In late 2005, Smith announced that she would run to succeed term-limited Prentiss in the Senate, along with Representatives Annie L. Key, Claudette Woodard and two other Democrats. While it was a contested primary, Smith defeated the opposition to take the District 21 nomination with 50.86% of the votes. She won the general election with 85.34% of the electorate. In the 127th General Assembly, Smith served as president of the OLBC.

Early in 2008, the Senate Democrats ousted Minority Leader Teresa Fedor and replaced her with Ray Miller, as well as Smith as assistant minority leader. With the beginning of the 128th General Assembly, the caucus retained Smith in her role as assistant minority leader under Capri Cafaro.

In 2010, Smith won election to a second term in the Senate, defeating Republican Burrell Jackson with 84.4% of the vote.

Smith resigned a month prior to the end of her term.

2021 U.S. House campaign 

On January 19, 2021, Smith declared her candidacy in the Democratic primary for the 2021 special election in Ohio's 11th congressional district. She placed fifth with 583 votes, 0.8% of the 75,064 total votes cast, in the August 3 primary.

Electoral history

Personal life
Smith is divorced with two children. She lives in Cleveland, but also owns property in South Euclid, Ohio.

References

External links
Campaign website
Profile from the Ohio Statehouse Museum

|-

|-

1950 births
Living people
African-American women in politics
Cleveland State University alumni
Harvard Kennedy School alumni
Members of the Ohio House of Representatives
Ohio state senators
Politicians from Cleveland
Women state legislators in Ohio
African-American state legislators in Ohio
Candidates in the 2021 United States elections
21st-century American politicians
21st-century American women politicians
21st-century African-American women
21st-century African-American politicians
20th-century African-American people
20th-century African-American women